Francis Walter Scott Wilcher (10 August 1883 – 8 June 1960) was an Australian rules footballer who played with Collingwood in the Victorian Football League (VFL). Before playing with the Magpies he appeared for Williamstown in 1903-04 before transferring to South Fremantle for the 1905 season, from where he was recruited to Victoria Park. He became Mayor of Williamstown in 1927-28.

Notes

External links 

Frank Wilcher's profile at Collingwood Forever

1883 births
1960 deaths
Australian rules footballers from Western Australia
Collingwood Football Club players
South Fremantle Football Club players
People from Williamstown, Victoria
Australian rules footballers from Melbourne
Mayors of places in Victoria (Australia)
Australian sportsperson-politicians
Politicians from Melbourne